G.S. Iraklis B.C. in international competitions is the history and statistics of G.S. Iraklis B.C. in FIBA Europe and Euroleague Basketball Company European-wide club basketball competitions.

1970s

1976–77 FIBA Korać Cup, 3rd–tier
The 1976–77 FIBA Korać Cup was the 6th installment of the European 3rd-tier level professional basketball club competition FIBA Korać Cup, running from October 19, 1976 to April 5, 1977. The trophy was won by Jugoplastika, who defeated Alco Bologna by a result of 87–84 at Palasport della Fiera in Genoa, Italy. Overall, Iraklis achieved in present competition a record of 1 win against 1 defeat, in only one round. More detailed:

First round
 Tie played on October 19, 1976 and on October 26, 1976.

|}

1980s

1981–82 FIBA Korać Cup, 3rd–tier
The 1981–82 FIBA Korać Cup was the 11th installment of the European 3rd-tier level professional basketball club competition FIBA Korać Cup, running from October 7, 1981 to March 18, 1982. The trophy was won by Limoges CSP, who defeated Šibenka by a result of 90–84 at Palasport San Lazzaro in Padua, Italy. Overall, Iraklis achieved in present competition a record of 1 win against 1 defeat, in only one round. More detailed:

First round
 Tie played on October 7, 1981 and on October 14, 1981.

|}

1982–83 FIBA Korać Cup, 3rd–tier
The 1982–83 FIBA Korać Cup was the 12th installment of the European 3rd-tier level professional basketball club competition FIBA Korać Cup, running from October 6, 1982 to March 8, 1983. The trophy was won by the title holder Limoges CSP, who defeated -for second consecutive time- Šibenka by a result of 94–86 at Deutschlandhalle in West Berlin, West Germany. Overall, Iraklis achieved in present competition a record of 0 wins against 2 defeats, in only one round. More detailed:

First round
 Tie played on October 6, 1982 and on October 13, 1982.

|}

1983–84 FIBA Korać Cup, 3rd–tier
The 1983–84 FIBA Korać Cup was the 13th installment of the European 3rd-tier level professional basketball club competition FIBA Korać Cup, running from September 28, 1983 to March 15, 1984. The trophy was won by Orthez, who defeated Crvena zvezda by a result of 97–73 at Palais des sports Pierre-de-Coubertin in Paris, France. Overall, Iraklis achieved in present competition a record of 1 win against 1 defeat, in only one round. More detailed:

First round
 Tie played on September 28, 1983 and on October 5, 1983.

|}

1985–86 FIBA Korać Cup, 3rd–tier
The 1985–86 FIBA Korać Cup was the 15th installment of the European 3rd-tier level professional basketball club competition FIBA Korać Cup, running from October 2, 1985 to March 27, 1986. The trophy was won by Banco di Roma, who defeated Mobilgirgi Caserta by a result of 157–150 in a two-legged final on a home and away basis. Overall, Iraklis achieved in present competition a record of 1 win against 1 defeat, in only one round. More detailed:

First round
 Tie played on October 2, 1985 and on October 9, 1985.

|}

1987–88 FIBA Korać Cup, 3rd–tier
The 1987–88 FIBA Korać Cup was the 17th installment of the European 3rd-tier level professional basketball club competition FIBA Korać Cup, running from September 23, 1987 to March 9, 1988. The trophy was won by Real Madrid, who defeated Cibona by a result of 195–183 in a two-legged final on a home and away basis. Overall, Iraklis achieved in present competition a record of 2 wins against 2 defeats, in two successive rounds. More detailed:

First round
 Tie played on September 23, 1987 and on September 30, 1987.

|}

Second round
 Tie played on October 14, 1987 and on October 21, 1987.

|}

1990s

1989–90 FIBA Korać Cup, 3rd–tier
The 1989–90 FIBA Korać Cup was the 19th installment of the European 3rd-tier level professional basketball club competition FIBA Korać Cup, running from September 27, 1989 to March 28, 1990. The trophy was won by Ram Joventut, who defeated Scavolini Pesaro by a result of 195–184 in a two-legged final on a home and away basis. Overall, Iraklis achieved in present competition a record of 3 wins against 7 defeats, in three successive rounds. More detailed:

First round
 Tie played on September 27, 1989 and on October 4, 1989.

|}

Second round
 Tie played on October 25, 1989 and on November 1, 1989.

|}

Top 16
 Day 1 (December 6, 1989)

|}

 Day 2 (December 13, 1989)

|}

 Day 3 (January 17, 1990)

|}

 Day 4 (January 24, 1990)

|}

 Day 5 (January 31, 1990)

|}

 Day 6 (February 7, 1990)

|}

 Group A standings:

1990–91 FIBA Korać Cup, 3rd–tier
The 1990–91 FIBA Korać Cup was the 20th installment of the European 3rd-tier level professional basketball club competition FIBA Korać Cup, running from September 26, 1990 to March 27, 1991. The trophy was won by Shampoo Clear Cantù, who defeated Real Madrid Otaysa by a result of 168–164 in a two-legged final on a home and away basis. Overall, Iraklis achieved in present competition a record of 4 wins against 6 defeats, in three successive rounds. More detailed:

First round
 Tie played on September 26, 1990 and on October 3, 1990.

|}

Second round
 Tie played on October 24, 1990 and on October 31, 1990.

|}

Top 16
 Day 1 (December 12, 1990)

|}

 Day 2 (December 19, 1990)

|}

 Day 3 (January 3, 1991)

|}

 Day 4 (January 9, 1991)

|}

 Day 5 (January 16, 1991)

|}

 Day 6 (January 23, 1991)

|}

 Group C standings:

1991–92 FIBA Korać Cup, 3rd–tier
The 1991–92 FIBA Korać Cup was the 21st installment of the European 3rd-tier level professional basketball club competition FIBA Korać Cup, running from October 2, 1991 to March 18, 1992. The trophy was won by il Messaggero Roma, who defeated Scavolini Pesaro by a result of 193–180 in a two-legged final on a home and away basis. Overall, Iraklis achieved in present competition a record of 3 wins against 7 defeats, in three successive rounds. More detailed:

First round
 Tie played on October 1, 1991 and on October 9, 1991.

|}

Second round
 Tie played on October 30, 1991 and on November 6, 1991.

|}

Top 16
 Day 1 (November 27, 1991)

|}

 Day 2 (December 4, 1991)

|}

 Day 3 (December 11, 1991)

|}

 Day 4 (December 18, 1991)

|}

 Day 5 (January 8, 1992)

|}

 Day 6 (January 15, 1992)

|}

 Group C standings:

1992–93 FIBA Korać Cup, 3rd–tier
The 1992–93 FIBA Korać Cup was the 22nd installment of the European 3rd-tier level professional basketball club competition FIBA Korać Cup, running from September 9, 1992 to March 18, 1993. The trophy was won by Philips Milano, who defeated Virtus Roma by a result of 201–181 in a two-legged final on a home and away basis. Overall, Replay Iraklis achieved in present competition a record of 7 wins against 3 defeats, in four successive rounds. More detailed:

First round
 Bye

Second round
 Tie played on September 29, 1992 and on October 7, 1992.

|}

Third round
 Tie played on October 26, 1992 and on November 4, 1992.

|}

Top 16
 Day 1 (November 25, 1992)

|}

 Day 2 (December 2, 1992)

|}

 Day 3 (December 9, 1992)

|}

 Day 4 (December 16, 1992)

|}

 Day 5 (January 6, 1993)

|}

 Day 6 (January 13, 1993)

|}

 Group B standings:

1994–95 FIBA European Cup, 2nd–tier
The 1994–95 FIBA European Cup was the 29th installment of FIBA's 2nd-tier level European-wide professional club basketball competition FIBA European Cup (lately called FIBA Saporta Cup), running from September 6, 1994 to March 14, 1995. The trophy was won by Benetton Treviso, who defeated Taugrés by a result of 94–86 at Abdi İpekçi Arena in Istanbul, Turkey. Overall, Iraklis Aspis Pronoia achieved in the present competition a record of 14 wins against 3 defeats, in five successive rounds. More detailed:

First round
 Bye

Second round
 Tie played on September 27, 1994 and on October 4, 1994.

|}

Third round
 Tie played on October 25, 1994 and on November 1, 1994.

|}

Top 12
 Day 1 (November 22, 1994)

|}

 Day 2 (November 29, 1994)

|}

 Day 3 (December 6, 1994)

|}

 Day 4 (December 13, 1994)

|}

 Day 5 (January 3, 1995)

|}

 Day 6 (January 10, 1995)

|}

 Day 7 (January 17, 1995)

|}

 Day 8 (January 24, 1995)

|}

 Day 9 (January 31, 1995)

|}

 Day 10 (February 7, 1995)

|}

 Group A standings:

Semifinals
 Best-of-3 playoff: Game 1 at home on February 14, 1995 / Game 2 away on February 21, 1995 / Game 3 away on February 23, 1995.

|}

1995–96 FIBA European League, 1st–tier
The 1995–96 FIBA European League was the 39th installment of the European top-tier level professional club competition for basketball clubs (now called EuroLeague), running from September 7, 1995 to April 11, 1996. The trophy was won by Panathinaikos, who defeated FC Barcelona Banca Catalana by a result of 67–66 at Palais Omnisports de Paris-Bercy in Paris, France. Overall, Iraklis Aspis Pronoia achieved in present competition a record of 5 wins against 11 defeats, in three successive rounds. More detailed:

First round
 Bye

Second round
 Tie played on September 28, 1995 and on October 5, 1995.

|}

Top 16
 Day 1 (October 26, 1995)

|}

 Day 2 (November 1, 1995)

|}

 Day 3 (November 23, 1995)

|}

 Day 4 (November 29, 1995)

|}

 Day 5 (December 6, 1995)

|}

 Day 6 (December 13, 1995)

|}

 Day 7 (December 20, 1995)

|}

 Day 8 (January 3, 1996)

|}

 Day 9 (January 11, 1996)

|}

 Day 10 (January 17, 1996)

|}

 Day 11 (January 24, 1996)

|}

 Day 12 (January 31, 1996)

|}

 Day 13 (February 7, 1996)

|}

 Day 14 (February 15, 1996)

|}

 Group A standings:

1996–97 FIBA EuroCup, 2nd–tier
The 1996–97 FIBA EuroCup was the 31st installment of FIBA's 2nd-tier level European-wide professional club basketball competition FIBA EuroCup (lately called FIBA Saporta Cup), running from September 17, 1996 to April 15, 1997. The trophy was won by Real Madrid Teka, who defeated Mash Jeans Verona by a result of 78–64 at Eleftheria Indoor Hall in Nicosia, Cyprus. Overall, Iraklis achieved in the present competition a record of 13 wins against 5 defeats, in five successive rounds. More detailed:

First round
 Day 1 (September 17, 1996)

|}

 Day 2 (September 24, 1996)

|}

 Day 3 (October 1, 1996)

|}

 Day 4 (October 8, 1996)

|}

 Day 5 (October 15, 1996)

|}

 Day 6 (November 5, 1996)

|}

 Day 7 (November 12, 1996)

|}

 Day 8 (November 19, 1996)

|}

 Day 9 (December 3, 1996)

|}

 Day 10 (December 10, 1996)

|}

 Group E standings:

Second round
 Tie played on January 14, 1997 and on January 21, 1997.

|}

Top 16
 Tie played on February 11, 1997 and on February 18, 1997.

|}

Quarterfinals
 Tie played on March 4, 1997 and on March 11, 1997.

|}

Semifinals
 Tie played on March 25, 1997 and on April 1, 1997.

|}

2000s

1999–2000 FIBA Saporta Cup, 2nd–tier
The 1999–2000 FIBA Saporta Cup was the 34th installment of FIBA's 2nd-tier level European-wide professional club basketball competition FIBA Saporta Cup, running from September 21, 1999 to April 11, 2000. The trophy was won by AEK, who defeated Kinder Bologna by a result of 83–76 at Centre Intercommunal de Glace de Malley in Lausanne, Switzerland. Overall, Hercules  achieved in the present competition a record of 14 wins against 2 defeats, in four successive rounds. More detailed:

First round
 Day 1 (September 21, 1999)

|}

 Day 2 (September 28, 1999)

|}

 Day 3 (October 5, 1999)

|}

 Day 4 (October 12, 1999)

|}

 Day 5 (October 19, 1999)

|}

 Day 6 (November 2, 1999)

|}

 Day 7 (November 9, 1999)

|}

 Day 8 (November 16, 1999)

|}

 Day 9 (December 7, 1999)

|}

 Day 10 (December 14, 1999)

|}

 Group E standings:

Second round
 Tie played on January 11, 2000 and on January 18, 2000.

|}

Top 16
 Tie played on February 8, 2000 and on February 15, 2000.

|}

Quarterfinals
 Tie played on March 1, 2000 and on March 7, 2000.

|}

2000–01 FIBA SuproLeague, 1st–tier
The 2000–01 FIBA SuproLeague was the FIBA European professional club basketball Champions' Cup for the 2000–01 season, running from October 19, 2000 to May 13, 2001. Up until that season, there was one cup, the FIBA European Champions' Cup (which is now called the EuroLeague), though in this season of 2000–01, the leading European teams split into two competitions: the FIBA SuproLeague and Euroleague Basketball Company's Euroleague 2000–01. The trophy was won by Maccabi Tel Aviv, who defeated Panathinaikos by a result of 81–67 at Palais Omnisports de Paris-Bercy in Paris, France. Overall, Iraklis achieved in the present competition a record of 11 wins against 10 defeats, in two successive rounds. More detailed:

Regular season
 Day 1 (October 18, 2000)

|}

 Day 2 (October 25, 2000)

|}

 Day 3 (November 1, 2000)

|}

 Day 4 (November 8, 2000)

|}

 Day 5 (November 15, 2000)

|}

 Day 6 (December 6, 2000)

|}

 Day 7 (December 13, 2000)

|}
*Overtime at the end of regulation (89–89).

 Day 8 (December 21, 2000)

|}

 Day 9 (January 3, 2001)

|}

 Day 10 (January 10, 2001)

|}

 Day 11 (January 18, 2001)

|}

 Day 12 (January 31, 2001)

|}

 Day 13 (February 7, 2001)

|}

 Day 14 (February 14, 2001)

|}

 Day 15 (February 21, 2001)

|}

 Day 16 (February 28, 2001)

|}

 Day 17 (March 8, 2001)

|}

 Day 18 (March 14, 2001)

|}

 Group B standings:

Top 16
 Best-of-3 playoff: Game 1 at home on March 27, 2001 / Game 2 away on March 29, 2001 / Game 3 at home on April 5, 2001.

|}

2001–02 FIBA Saporta Cup, 2nd–tier
The 2001–02 FIBA Saporta Cup was the 36th installment of FIBA's 2nd-tier level European-wide professional club basketball competition FIBA Saporta Cup, running from October 30, 2001 to April 30, 2002. The trophy was won by Montepaschi Siena, who defeated Pamesa Valencia by a result of 81–71 at Palais des Sports de Gerland in Lyon, France. Overall, Iraklis achieved in the present competition a record of 8 wins against 4 defeats, in two successive rounds. More detailed:

Regular season
 Day 1 (October 30, 2001)

|}

 Day 2 (November 6, 2001)

|}

 Day 3 (November 13, 2001)

|}

 Day 4 (December 4, 2001)

|}

 Day 5 (December 11, 2001)

|}

 Day 6 (December 18, 2001)

|}

 Day 7 (January 8, 2002)

|}
*Overtime at the end of regulation (79–79).

 Day 8 (January 15, 2002)

|}

 Day 9 (January 29, 2002)

|}

 Day 10 (February 5, 2002)

|}

 Group D standings:

Top 16
 Tie played on February 26, 2002 and on March 5, 2002.

|}
*The score in the second leg at the end of regulation was 76–64 for Iraklis, so it was necessary to play an extra-time to decide the winner of this match.

2004–05 FIBA Europe League, 3rd–tier
The 2004–05 FIBA Europe League was the 2nd installment of FIBA's 3rd-tier level European-wide professional club basketball competition FIBA Europe League (later called FIBA EuroChallenge), running from October 26, 2004 to April 28, 2005. The trophy was won by Dynamo Saint Petersburg, who defeated Kyiv by a result of 85–74 at Abdi İpekçi Arena in Istanbul, Turkey. Overall, Iraklis achieved in the present competition a record of 3 wins against 11 defeats, in only one round. More detailed:

Regular season
 Day 1 (October 26, 2004)

|}

 Day 2 (November 2, 2004)

|}

 Day 3 (November 10, 2004)

|}

 Day 4 (November 16, 2004)

|}

 Day 5 (November 23, 2004)

|}

 Day 6 (November 30, 2004)

|}

 Day 7 (December 7, 2004)

|}

 Day 8 (December 14, 2004)

|}

 Day 9 (December 21, 2004)

|}

 Day 10 (January 11, 2005)

|}

 Day 11 (January 18, 2005)

|}
*Lavovi 063 withdrew after Competition Day 7 and all the remaining games were declared null and void.

 Day 12 (January 25, 2005)

|}

 Day 13 (February 1, 2005)

|}

 Day 14 (February 8, 2005)

|}

 Group D standings:

Record
Iraklis has an overall record, from 1976–77 (first participation) to 2004–05 (last participation) of: 91 wins against 77 defeats, in 168 games played in all of the European-wide club competitions.
 (1st–tier) FIBA European League & FIBA SuproLeague: 16–21 in 37 games.
 (2nd–tier) FIBA European Cup, or FIBA EuroCup, or FIBA Saporta Cup: 49–14 in 63 games.
 (3rd–tier) FIBA Korać Cup: 23–31 in 54 games.
 (3rd–tier) FIBA Europe League: 3–11 in 14 games.

See also
 Greek basketball clubs in international competitions

Notes

References

External links
FIBA Europe
EuroLeague
ULEB
EuroCup

Europe 
Greek basketball clubs in European and worldwide competitions